Young Woman Seated at a Virginal or A Young Woman Seated at a Virginal are alternate titles for two different works of art, neither of which is a copy of the other, both by Johannes Vermeer:

 A Young Woman Seated at the Virginals, Leiden Collection, New York
 Lady Seated at a Virginal at the National Gallery, London

Both paintings may have the title "Young Woman Seated at a Virginal", although other sources use the alternate titles given here. Both paintings are estimated to have been painted sometime from 1670 to 1672.

See also
 Lady Standing at a Virginal (1673-1675), a different painting by Vermeer with almost the same name
 List of paintings by Johannes Vermeer, including paintings of other women with virginals and other musical instruments